Walter Ledgard Jr. (born 3 January 1945) is a Peruvian former freestyle swimmer. He competed in three events at the 1964 Summer Olympics.

He is the father of Olympic cyclist Tony Ledgard and the son of Olympic swimmer Walter Ledgard Sr.

References

External links
 

1945 births
Living people
Peruvian male freestyle swimmers
Olympic swimmers of Peru
Swimmers at the 1964 Summer Olympics
Place of birth missing (living people)
20th-century Peruvian people